The women's freestyle 62 kilograms wrestling competition at the 2018 Asian Games in Jakarta was held on 20 August 2018 at the Jakarta Convention Center Assembly Hall.

On 3 September 2018, it was announced that Pürevdorjiin Orkhon had tested positive for stanozolol in a urine test conducted on 20 August 2018. Orkhon was disqualified and stripped of her gold medal.

Schedule
All times are Western Indonesia Time (UTC+07:00)

Results
Legend
F — Won by fall

Main bracket

Repechage

Final standing

 Pürevdorjiin Orkhon of Mongolia originally won the gold medal, but was disqualified after she tested positive for Stanozolol.

References

External links
Official website
Results Book

Wrestling at the 2018 Asian Games
2018 in women's sport wrestling